Corynellus lampyrimorphus is a species of beetle in the family Cerambycidae. It was described by Swift in 2008.

References

Pteroplatini
Beetles described in 2008